Dovrat Van Ouwerkerk (née Bendel) is an Israeli football striker currently playing in the Israeli First League for F.C. Kiryat Gat. She played the European Cup with Maccabi Holon and she has been a member of the Israeli national team; she made her debut in the 2003 World Cup qualifying against Romania.

Club career
Bendel started her career at the age of 14, joining Maccabi Tel Aviv. In 2002, after Maccabi Tel Aviv had folded, Bendel joined Maccabi Holon, where she stayed until 2007. Bendel scored the first goal for Maccabi Holon in the championship match in 2003, helping the team to beat Maccabi Haifa 2–1. On 14 September 2003, while playing for Israel against Kazakhstan, Bendel injured her right knee and was out for the remainder of the season. Bendel returned the next season, but injured her right knee again on 26 September 2004, in an Israel U-19 practice before the 2005 UEFA Women's Under-19 Championship qualifying tournament and once again missed the rest of the season, as well as the following season.

In summer 2007 Bendel transferred from Maccabi Holon to Hapoel Petah Tikva, where she played two matches before being loaned to ASA Tel Aviv University. On 25 June 2008 Bendel injured her right knee again in a match against Austria, and briefly quit football.

From the year 2008–2011 Bendel played in the Spanish league, with Real Sociedad. She finished 3 years with the most goals and was called up to the Spanish national team as well.

Bendel returned to  the Israeli football in 2011 and re-joined Hapoel Petah Tikva, where she played for the next two seasons. In 2013–14 Bendel was loaned to Maccabi Kishronot Hadera and later to Maccabi Be'er Sheva, and returned to Hapoel Petah Tikva at the end of the season. In January 2015 Bendel was loaned to F.C. Kiryat Gat.

International career
Bendel made her debut in Israel women's national football team in 2002 against Romania but was limited to 7 matches for the national team due to her injuries. Bendel also played for the U-19 national team, making three appearances and scoring two goals, all during 2003 UEFA Women's Under-19 Championship qualifying tournament.

Honours
Championships (4):
With Maccabi Holon: 2002–03, 2005–06, 2006–07
WITH 'XXKiryat Gat S.C:
2016–17,Cup (4):With Maccabi Holon: 2002–03, 2005–06, 2006–07
With Kiryat Gat S.C''':
2015–16

References

1986 births
Living people
Israeli women's footballers
Israel women's international footballers
Maccabi Tel Aviv F.C. (women) players
Maccabi Holon F.C. (women) players
Hapoel Petah Tikva F.C. (women) players
ASA Tel Aviv University players
Maccabi Kishronot Hadera F.C. players
Maccabi Be'er Sheva F.C. (women) players
F.C. Kiryat Gat (women) players
Women's association football forwards